The Mayak mine is a large copper mine located in the center of Russia in Krasnoyarsk Krai. Mayak represents one of the largest copper reserve in Russia and in the world having estimated reserves of 456.7 million tonnes of ore grading 2.05% copper.

See also 
 List of mines in Russia

References 

Copper mines in Russia